HMK may refer to:
 Hammock Music, an American record label
 Hindu Makkal Katchi, a political party in Tamil Nadu, India
 Hindumalkote railway station, in Pakistan
 Ye-Maek language, an unclassified language of Manchuria and Korea